Lalande may refer to:

People
 André Lalande (1913–1995), officer in the French Foreign Legion
 André Lalande (philosopher) (1867–1963), French philosopher
 Charles-André-Toussaint-Bruno de Ramond-Lalande (1761-1830), Roman Catholic bishop
 François Lalande (1930–2020), French actor
 Hec Lalande (1934-2010), Canadian ice hockey player
 Hyacinthe Marie de Lalande de Calan (1802-1850), Governor General of French India
 Henriette Méric-Lalande (1798-1867), French operatic soprano
 Jean de Lalande (died 1646), Jesuit missionary
 Jérôme Lalande (1732–1807), French astronomer and writer
 Julien Pierre Anne Lalande (1787–1844), French admiral
 Louis Lalande (active from 2011), Canadian television executive
 Kevin Lalande (born 1987), Canadian-Belarusian ice hockey goaltender
 Marie-Jeanne de Lalande (1760–1832), French astronomer
 Michel Lefrançois de Lalande (1766-1839), French astronomer
 Michel-Richard Delalande (1657–1726), French composer
 Patrice Martin-Lalande (born 1947), French politician
 Tommy Lalande (1904-1983), South African long-distance runner
 Veronica Lalande-Lapointe (active 2006), Canadian ten-pin bowler

Places in France
 Lalande, Yonne, a commune
 Lalande-de-Pomerol, a commune in the Gironde department
 Lalande-de-Pomerol AOC, for wine
 Lalande-en-Son, a commune in the Oise department

Other uses
 9136 Lalande, a minor planet
 De Lalande (crater), on Venus
 French cruiser Lalande, launched 1889
 Hôtel de Lalande, a townhouse in Bordeaux, France, now a museum
 Lalande (crater), a lunar crater
 Histoire céleste française, Lalande catalog of stars
 Lalande 1299, a star
 Lalande 21185, a star
 Lalande 25372, a star
 Lalande Prize, a former French award for astronomy

See also
 Château de Lalande (disambiguation)
 De Lalande (disambiguation)
 Edison–Lalande cell, an alkaline battery
 

French-language surnames